The Awetí language or Aweti language, is one of the Tupian languages of Central Brazil. Spoken by the indigenous people that live along the Upper Xingu River, the language is in danger of becoming extinct with a declining 150 living speakers. The Aweti people live in a multilingual area due to various indigenous people settling there from various regions. In search of refuge many people have relocated to the reserve as a result of European colonialism.

Sociolinguistic situation 
In 2002 there was a major shift in the Xingu tribe. A group of Aweti people separated from the main village and built their own. Because the family spoke both Aweti and Kamaiura it lessened the amount of Aweti speakers in the main village and it continued to decrease the amount of Aweti speakers in the new village as they began to communicate in Kamaiura only. Because of this many Aweti people only speak Kamaiura today. Most Aweti people are multilingual. Portuguese is the main language of Brazil so a lot of Aweti people also speak Portuguese especially the younger generation since that is what is spoken at school.

Name of the language 
The language can also be found under the forms Awety, Awetö, Aueto, Aueti, Auiti, Auití and Auetö, and similar variants.

The name of the language originates from the ethnonym [aˈwɨtɨ] by which the Awetí are known among neighbouring groups. They call themselves [awɨˈtɨʐa], with the Awetí collective suffix ‑za, and call their own language [awɨˈtɨʐa tʃĩˈʔĩŋku], Awytyza ti'ingku (language of the Awetí).

In the writings of the early –German– explorers, the name appears as “Auetö” or “Auetö́”. (That is, the first [ɨ], without stress in Awetí, was represented as 〈e〉, possibly for its resemblance with ‘schwa’ [ə], a common sound in German. The second [ɨ] was written as 〈ö〉, a letter which represents in German the sounds [œ] and [ø], which also come somewhat close to [ɨ].)

The 〈u〉 was later substituted by 〈w〉 (in accordance with the rules for representing indigenous names established by the Brazilian Anthropology Association, ABA), and the 〈ö〉, unknown in Portuguese, was substituted by 〈i〉, less frequently by 〈o〉, or sometimes even by 〈e〉 or 〈y〉.

Today, the most common designation for the group and their language is Awetí or Aweti (the latter more often used in Portuguese). In English, the preferred spelling has an acute accent on the final 〈i〉 (again in accordance with the norms established by the ABA), so as to encourage a pronunciation with stress on the last syllable, which is how the name is pronounced in Portuguese, including by the Awetí themselves when speaking Portuguese.

Several different spellings of the people and language can be found in the literature. They differ in having one or several of the above changes applied or not applied: 〈u〉–〈w〉, 〈ö〉–〈i〉–〈e〉–〈y〉, graphical accent or not, sometimes also the 〈e〉 [middle syllable] is substituted by 〈i〉. In particular in older and non-Brazilian literature, one finds, for instance: Awetö, Aueto, Aueti, Auiti, rarely also Auetê or even Auety, etc.
Sometimes (notably in the “Ethnologue”) the Awetí are confused with other central Brazilian groups such as the Arauine and Arauite, both extinct in the beginnings of the 20th century.

Phonology

Consonants 

Aweti does not contain voiced stops, however the language does have stress. s and ʃ are replaced with ts.

Vowels 

These are all the vowels that are used in Aweti. As is common in Tupian languages, each vowel has a plain and a nasal counterpart.

Lexicality 
Subordination plays a big role in Aweti speech and text. Nominal modification and predicate complementation are used through subordinatory phrases.

References

External links

Tupian languages
Endangered Tupian languages
Languages of Xingu Indigenous Park